The 2022 Pan American Championships were held in Santa Cruz de la Sierra, Bolivia, April 9-16. Bolivian Angélica Barrios won Women's Singles and fellow Bolivian Conrrado Moscoso won Men's Singles, and both Barrios and Moscoso won for the first time. Barrios's victory was the first for a Bolivian woman at Pan Am Championships, while Moscoso's win was the third consecutive Bolivian gold in Men's Singles, as Carlos Keller won the previous two events.

In doubles, Canadians Coby Iwaasa and Samuel Murray won Men's Doubles, which was the 4th Canadian win in the event, but the first for both Iwaasa and Murray. Argentina won Women's Doubles for the first time, as Natalia Mendez and Maria Jose Vargas took the title. It was Mendez's first Pan Am Championship, but the second for Vargas, who won Women's Singles in 2014.

The 2022 Pan American Championships were the first to use rally scoring, which was adopted by the International Racquetball Federation in early 2022. Also, Mixed Doubles and Men's and Women's Team competitions were implemented for the first time. In the team competitions, countries compete head-to-head over three matches: two singles matches and a doubles match. Argentina and Bolivia were the first team champions: Argentina winning the Women's Team competition and Bolivia the Men's Team competition. Mexicans Rodrigo Montoya and Samantha Salas were the first Mixed Doubles Pan American Champions.

Tournament format
The competition had seven events: five individual events and two team events. The individual events were played first: Men’s and Women’s Singles and Doubles and Mixed Doubles. Each individual event had a group stage followed by a medal round. The results of the group stage were used to seed players for the medal round. The group stage began April 9 and concluded April 11. The medal round began April 12 and concluded April 14. The team events were held on April 15 and 16.

Participating nations
A total of 54 athletes (30 men & 24 women) from 12 countries participated.

Medal summary

Medal table

Medalists

Men’s singles

Preliminary round
Group A

Group B

Group C

Group D

Group E

Group F

Medal round

Men’s doubles

Group A

Group B

Group C

Medal Round

Women’s singles

Preliminary round
Group A

Group B

Group C

Group D

Group E

Medal round

Women’s doubles

Preliminary round
Group A

Group B

Medal round

Mixed doubles

Group A

Group B

Group C

Medal Round

Team Competitions

Men’s Team

Semi-finals

Final

Women’s Team

Semi-finals

Final

References

Racquetball
2022 in racquetball
2022 in Bolivian sport
International sports competitions hosted by Bolivia
Pan American Racquetball Championships